Certified refers to the confirmation of certain characteristics of an object, person, or organization.

Certified may also refer
 Certified (Herb Robertson album), 1991
 Certified (David Banner album), 2005
 Certified (Lil' Flip & Gudda Gudda album), 2009 
 Certified (Unladylike album), 2009
"Certified" (song), a song by Glasses Malone